Chalupka is a surname. Notable people with the surname include:

 Ján Chalupka (1791–1871), Slovak dramatist, playwright, publicist
 Samo Chalupka (1812-1883), Slovak romantic poet
 Franciszek Chalupka, (1856–1909), Polish-American clergy in New England

Surnames of Slovak origin